Peter Leitch may refer to:
 Sir Peter Leitch (businessman) (born 1944), New Zealand businessman nicknamed "The Mad Butcher"
 Peter Leitch (musician) (born 1944), Canadian jazz guitarist
 Peter Leitch (VC) (1820–1892), Scottish soldier who received the Victoria Cross